Can't Lose (lit. "Can't Live With Losing") is a 2011 South Korean romantic comedy television series, starring Choi Ji-woo and Yoon Sang-hyun, who play two bickering, married divorce lawyers who take out their frustrations on each other in and out of the courtroom. It aired on MBC from August 24 to October 20, 2011 on Wednesdays and Thursdays at 21:55 for 18 episodes.

It is a remake of the 2008 Japanese drama .

Plot

Eun-Jae (Choi Ji-woo) and Hyung-Woo (Yoon Sang-hyun) have been married for one year. They are both lawyers.

They first met at a baseball game when they happened to have seats next to each other. During the baseball game they kissed and fell in love. Hyung-Woo told Eun-Jae that he wants to become a human rights lawyer. Eun-Jae supports his dream and they opened their own law firm together.

One year later, the thrill is gone in their relationship. Eun-Jae struggles to maintain the law firm alone, while Hyung-Woo helps clients who are not able to pay much for his services. Their interests have also diverged. One day, the couple learns that Eun-Jae did not register their marriage. The next day, Eun-Jae goes to file the proper papers. Eun-Jae is unhappy that Hyung-Woo is so generous to others and wants him to think about her more. Later on, Hyung-Woo's friends, who are a couple, stops by the law firm and the wife, Young-Joo (Jo Mi-ryung) insists that she wants a divorce. Young-Joo states that her husband Ki-Chan (Kim Jung-tae) hasn't worked in years and, yet, still gave his family a large sum of money. The married couple start yelling at each other. Ki-Chan states that he borrowed the money from Hyung-Woo.

Meanwhile, Eun-Jae hears of the loan and has had enough. Eun-Jae decides that they need a serious talk. Eun-Jae and Hyung-Woo then book a trip to Japan where they had their honeymoon. Hyung-Woo then mistakenly text messages his itinerary to his mother instead of Eun-Jae. When Hyung-Woo and Eun-Jae arrive at the airport they find Hyung-Woo's mother there as well, believing she was invited to their trip to Japan. Making matters worse Hyung-Woo receives a phone call from his mother-in-law asking to see him immediately and to keep it a secret. Hyung-Woo doesn't know why his wife and his mother-in-law doesn't get along or why he was never formally introduced to his mother-in-law, but he feels obligated to meet her and leaves ...

Cast
Choi Ji-woo as Lee Eun-jae
Yoon Sang-hyun as Yeon Hyung-woo
Kim Jung-tae as Go Ki-chan
Jo Mi-ryung as Kim Young-joo
Park Won-sook as Yoo Jung-nan
Sung Dong-il as Jo Jung-goo
Joo Jin-mo as Kang Woo-shik
Kim Ja-ok as Hong Geum-ji
Ha Seok-jin as Lee Tae-young
Ga Deuk-hee as Ga Deuk-hee
Kim Jin-woo as So Joo-hyun
Song Jae-ho as Grandfather (guest, ep 1-4)
Lee Soo-kyung as Eun Hee-soo (guest, ep 3-5)
Kim Na-woon as Eun-jae's divorce lawyer (guest, ep 5)
Lee Sang-yeob as Yeon Hyung-joo, Hyung-woo's younger brother (guest, ep 6,9)
Ahn Yong-joon as Jung Ji-ho (guest, ep 12-13)
Um Ki-joon as Cha Seok-hoon (guest, ep 14-17)
Kang Boo-ja (guest)
Shin Goo as Go Jung-dae (cameo)

Ratings

International broadcast
 It aired in Japan on TBS from January 31 to February 25, 2013. It also aired in Malaysia on 8TV.
 It aired in Vietnam from July 31, 2012 on SCTV film channel, called Không thể mất em.

References

External links
Can't Lose official MBC website 
Hate to Lose at MBC Global Media

Korean-language television shows
2011 South Korean television series debuts
2011 South Korean television series endings
MBC TV television dramas
South Korean romantic comedy television series
Television series by Victory Contents